Elliot Richardson (1920–1999) was Attorney General of the United States. Attorney General Richardson may also refer to:

Selwyn Richardson (1935–1995), Attorney-General of Trinidad and Tobago
William P. Richardson (Ohio politician) (1824–1886), Attorney General of Ohio

See also
General Richardson (disambiguation)